Randall Fuller (January 29, 1944) is an American rock singer, songwriter, and bass player best known for his work in the popular 60s rock group the Bobby Fuller Four with his older brother, Bobby Fuller.

Early life
Early on, Fuller took up trombone in his school band, later switching to guitar. With a reel-to-reel tape player, he and his brother made their own recordings, dubbing their group "Captain Fuller and the Rocket Squad". With his parents concerned with his troubling behavior, Randy was sent to military school. When Fuller went to military school, he left his guitar behind. At this point, his brother Bobby taught himself how to play guitar. By the time Randy returned, Fuller was already a self-taught professional. When Bobby wanted to start his own band in 1962, he immediately recruited Randy to play bass. While Randy wasn't enthused about the instrument, he nonetheless agreed. Randy was present on all of Bobby's El Paso singles, all of became regional hits. Despite an ever-changing lineup, Randy and Bobby were the two consistent members, though Mike Ciccarelli filled in for Randy on one occasion while he was sick. Randy also helped build the homemade recording studio in the Fullers' home, in which all the independent releases by Fuller were recorded.

Career
By 1963, Randy and the band went to Hollywood to play a set of gigs and look for a major record deal. While they didn't find any takers, Bob Keane of Del-Fi Records showed interest. Meanwhile, the band returned to El Paso and put out more singles, the most popular being "I Fought the Law". Randy, inspired by the film Rebel Without a Cause, convinced Bobby to record the song from In Style with the Crickets. Later that year, Randy pushed Bobby into returning to Hollywood, where they were then signed to Del-Fi by Keane.

After initially struggling to put out a hit, the band, now dubbed The Bobby Fuller Four, found success with "Let Her Dance". The song was noted for its bottle-tapping rhythm and catchy bass line, both the result of Randy's input. The success of "Let Her Dance" was later eclipsed by the group's re-recording of "I Fought the Law". With the professional mixing by Keane and Randy's driving bass, the song became a national hit at No. 9 on the national charts. While the band's chemistry began to erode following their breakout success, Bobby's sudden death on July 18, 1966, caused the Bobby Fuller Four to immediately disband.

While initially stricken, Randy was convinced to continue his musical career by former bandmate DeWayne Quirico. Fuller released a string of singles as The Randy Fuller Four, but was never able to duplicate the success of his previous band. In 1969, Fuller joined New Buffalo Springfield, penning many memorable arrangements. Since then, Randy has had many musical endeavors, many of which involve reuniting with former members of the Bobby Fuller Four. Recently, Randy has revived the Randy Fuller Four with DeWayne Quirico, and performed classic songs of the Bobby Fuller Four to great acclaim.

In 2015, Fuller collaborated with Miriam Linna to put out I Fought the Law: The Life and Strange Death of Bobby Fuller - the first authorized biography of Bobby Fuller and the Bobby Fuller Four.

References

General references
Shakedown! The Texas Tapes Revisited (CD liner). Del-Fi Records. 1996.

Notes

External links

1944 births
Living people
People from Hobbs, New Mexico
American male singer-songwriters
American rock singers
American male pop singers
American pop guitarists
American trombonists
Male trombonists
20th-century American singers
21st-century American singers
20th-century American bass guitarists
21st-century American bass guitarists
21st-century trombonists
20th-century trombonists
Songwriters from New Mexico
Guitarists from New Mexico
American male bass guitarists
20th-century American male singers
21st-century American male singers
American singer-songwriters